Fuchsia orientalis is a species of plant in the family Onagraceae. It is endemic to Ecuador.

References

Endemic flora of Ecuador
orientalis
Least concern plants
Taxonomy articles created by Polbot
Plants described in 1982